Helen Moewaka Barnes is a New Zealand academic. She is Māori, of Te Kapotai (Ngāpuhi) and Ngapuhi-nui-tonu descent and is currently a full professor at Massey University. In 2021 Barnes was made a Fellow of the Royal Society Te Apārangi.

Academic career

After a 2008 PhD thesis titled Arguing for the spirit in the language of the mind: a Māori practitioner's view of research and science, Barnes joined the staff, rising to full professor in 2013.

In 2010, 2011, 2012 and 2013, she received four separate grants from the Health Research Council, alongside a Fulbright award in 2015 and a 2013 Marsden Fund award.

Barnes is part of the New Zealand Arrestee Drug Use Monitoring project, which surveys arrestees in the criminal justice system to compile statistics on drug use.

Barnes' work looks at health from a kaupapa Māori perspective.

Awards 
In March 2021, Barnes was made a Fellow of the Royal Society Te Apārangi, recognising her "significant international impact in the field of Indigenous peoples' health and wellbeing".

Selected works 
 Barnes, Helen Moewaka. "Kaupapa maori: explaining the ordinary." Pacific Health Dialog 7, no. 1 (2000): 13–16.
 McCreanor, Tim, Antonia Lyons, Christine Griffin, Ian Goodwin, Helen Moewaka Barnes, and Fiona Hutton. "Youth drinking cultures, social networking and alcohol marketing: Implications for public health." Critical Public Health 23, no. 1 (2013): 110–120.
 Barnes, Helen Moewaka. "Collaboration in community action: a successful partnership between indigenous communities and researchers." Health Promotion International 15, no. 1 (2000): 17–25.
 McCreanor, Timothy, Alison Greenaway, Helen Moewaka Barnes, Suaree Borell, and Amanda Gregory. "Youth identity formation and contemporary alcohol marketing." Critical Public Health 15, no. 3 (2005): 251–262.
 McCreanor, Tim, Helen Moewaka Barnes, Mandi Gregory, Hector Kaiwai, and Suaree Borell. "Consuming identities: Alcohol marketing and the commodification of youth experience." Addiction Research & Theory 13, no. 6 (2005): 579–590.

References

External links
 researchgate 
 Massey homepage
 SHORE and Whariki homepage
 MĀRAMATANGA homepage

Living people
Year of birth missing (living people)
New Zealand women academics
New Zealand Māori academics
Academic staff of the Massey University
Massey University alumni
New Zealand Māori women academics
New Zealand women writers
Fellows of the Royal Society of New Zealand